Eriq Timmons, professionally known as Freak Nasty, is an American hip hop recording artist and record producer from New Orleans La. He was raised in New Orleans. He is best known for his Top 40 single "Da' Dip" released in 1996 which was a sleeper hit, and ultimately went mainstream in the summer 1997; it later peaked number 15 on the Hot 100. Later he released "Do What U Feel" from the album Which Way Is Up, but it failed to reach the success of the previous song, making it to 87 on the Hot R&B charts.

Music career
Freak Nasty began his career as a DJ and a hip hop producer. He was one of two, in a group called PMW. He then found success in Atlanta, Georgia with his first album Freak Nasty, selling close to 300,000 units. His next album Controversee... That's Life... And That's the Way It Is, was a much bigger hit and sold over 5 million units, mainly due to his smash hit single "Da' Dip", which peaked at number 15 on the Billboard Hot 100. In 2007, the single "Do It Just Like a Rockstar" peaked at number 45 on the Billboard Hot 100.

Discography

Albums
 Freak Nasty (1994)
 Controversee...That's Life...And That's the Way It Is (1996)
 Freak Nasty Da' Dip (1997)
 Which Way Is Up? (2000)
 Freak Nasty World (2002)
 Zahira Sims (Party Mix) (2005)
 Freaknotic/Crunk City (2007)

Singles

References

External links
  on facebook

African-American male rappers
Rappers from Atlanta
Southern hip hop musicians
Songwriters from Georgia (U.S. state)
American hip hop record producers
African-American record producers
Living people
21st-century American rappers
21st-century American male musicians
African-American songwriters
21st-century African-American musicians
American male songwriters
Year of birth missing (living people)